Åland Vocational School (Swedish: Ålands yrkesgymnasium) is a Swedish speaking vocational school in Mariehamn in Åland. The school is part of Ålands gymnasium together with Ålands lyceum.

The principal of Ålands yrkesgymnasium is Gitte Holmström with a mandate from 2018 to 2025.

The vocational school was founded 1.8.2011 with the merger of previous vocational schools in Åland: Ålands Hotell- och Restaurangskola, Ålands handelsläroverk, Ålands sjömansskola, Ålands vårdinstitut and Ålands yrkesskola. As of 2022 there are 18 different programs to study at the school.

The Maritime education program (Ålands sjömansskola until 2011) is part of Alandica Shipping Academy that covers all maritime education in the Åland Islands. The school was donated a Wärtsilä 9L20-engine for use in maritime education in 2021.

See also 

 Education in Åland

External links 

 website of Ålands yrkesgymnasium

References 

Buildings and structures in Åland
Mariehamn
Organisations based in Åland
Vocational schools
Secondary schools in Finland
Finland Swedish
Educational institutions established in 2011
2011 establishments in Finland